Christopher Ramsey (born 3 August 1986) is an English actor, comedian and presenter. After appearing in Hebburn as Jack (2012–2013), Ramsey began presenting series including I'm A Celebrity: Extra Camp (2016),  Virtually Famous (2016–2017) and Stand Up Central (2017).

In 2017, he began presenting The Chris Ramsey Show, and went on to compete in the seventeenth series of Strictly Come Dancing. In 2020, he presented the BBC talent series Little Mix: The Search.

Career
Ramsey began his career in comedy in 2007 by hosting an open-mic night in Newcastle upon Tyne.
In 2008, he was a nominee for the "Chortle Student Comedian of the Year". In 2010, Ramsey took his first solo show, Aggrophobic, to the Edinburgh Festival Fringe. His 2011 show, Offermation, was nominated for an Edinburgh Comedy Award. Offermation was recorded for BBC Radio 4, and broadcast in March 2012. Ramsey's 2012 Edinburgh show was Feeling Lucky which was followed by a national tour. In November 2012 he appeared on Sky 1's Soccer AM as a guest but was removed from the programme for using offensive language twice live on air.

From October 2012 to December 2013, Ramsey starred as Jack Pearson in Jason Cook's BBC Two sitcom Hebburn. The show is set in Hebburn, near to Ramsey's hometown, South Shields. It screened for two series and a Christmas special. In 2014, Ramsey appeared on Live at the Apollo for the first time. In 2015, he took part in the Channel 4 series Time Crashers. In 2016, Ramsey co-presented I'm A Celebrity: Extra Camp on ITV2 alongside Joe Swash, Vicky Pattison and Stacey Solomon. He was replaced by Joel Dommett for the 2017 series. He replaced Kevin McHale as the presenter of Virtually Famous from December 2016. He also presented his own series The Chris Ramsey Show for Comedy Central, beginning January 2017.

Ramsey is a regular fixture at the Funny Way To Be Comedy Club in Barnard Castle, having performed there on eight occasions. In May 2017, it was confirmed that Ramsey would take over from Russell Howard as the host of Stand Up Central, due to Howard being busy with tour commitments.

In March 2020, it was announced that Ramsey would be presenting the upcoming BBC talent competition series Little Mix: The Search, which began airing in September 2020.

In 2022, he was a contestant on Series 13 of Taskmaster, on which he placed 2nd.

Strictly Come Dancing
From September 2019, Ramsey competed in the seventeenth series of Strictly Come Dancing, paired with professional dancer Karen Hauer. The couple reached the semi-final and finished in fourth place.

1Score awarded by guest judge Alfonso Ribeiro

Personal life
While appearing on Strictly, Ramsey spoke openly about his problems as a teenager, resulting from bad acne, which caused him to take up comedy as a way to deal with his troubles.

Ramsey married Rosie Winter on 25 July 2014 and they have two young sons, Robin and Rafe. In 2018, the couple shared via social media that Rosie had had a miscarriage when she was 12 weeks pregnant with their second child. In February 2019, the pair started a weekly podcast called Shagged Married Annoyed which they co-host from their home. In July 2020, they announced via social media that they were expecting again. Their second son, Rafe, was born on 6 January 2021.

Filmography
Russell Howard's Good News - Guest Comedian
Mock the Week – Guest panellist
Live at the Apollo (2014) – Guest performer
Hebburn (2012–2013) – Jack Pearson
Never Mind The Buzzcocks – Guest panellist, 3 episodes
Richard Bacon's Beer & Pizza Club (2011) – Guest, 1 episode
Argumental (2011) – Guest, 1 episode
8 Out of 10 Cats (2011, 2013) – Guest panellist, 4 episodes
Celebrity Juice (2011–present) – Guest panellist, 20 episodes
Sweat the Small Stuff (2013–2014) – Guest panellist, 3 episodes
Celebrity Mastermind (2013) – Contestant, 1 episode
8 Out of 10 Cats Does Countdown (2013) – Guest panellist, 1 episode
Celebrity Squares – Guest
A Question of Sport: Super Saturday (2014) – Guest, 1 episode
Virtually Famous (2014–2015) – Guest panellist, 4 episodes
The John Bishop Show (2015) – Guest performer, 1 episode
Time Crashers (2015) – Participant
Celebrity Benchmark (2015) – Contestant, 5 episodes
Russell Howard/Chris Ramsey's Stand Up Central (2016, 2017) – Guest performer, 1 episode (2016), Presenter (2017)
It's Not Me, It's You (2016) – Guest, 3 episodes
Prank Pad (2016–present) – Voiceover/narrator
I'm a Celebrity: Extra Camp (2016) – Co-presenter
Virtually Famous (2016–2017) – Presenter
The Chris Ramsey Show (2017–present) – Presenter
Richard Osman's House of Games (2017) – Contestant
The Chase: Celebrity Specials (2017) – Contestant
Strictly Come Dancing (2019) – Contestant
Little Mix: The Search (2020) – Presenter
The One Show (2020) – Presenter
Children in Need (2020, 2022) - Presenter
Celebrity Catchphrase (2020) – Contestant
The Chris & Rosie Ramsey Show (2022) – Co-presenter
Taskmaster (2022) – Contestant, series 13

Tours
Offermation (2011)
Feeling Lucky (2012)
The Most Dangerous Man on Saturday Morning Television (2014)
All Growed Up (2015–2016)
Is That Chris Ramsey? (2017–2018)
The Just Happy to Get Out of the House Tour (2018–2019)
Chris Ramsey: 20/20 (2021-2022)
Shagged Married Annoyed Live! (2021-2022)
A second Shagged Married Annoyed tour has been announced for autumn 2023.

References

External links
 
 
 
 

1986 births
Living people
21st-century English comedians
21st-century English male actors
English male television actors
English stand-up comedians
People from South Shields
Comedians from Tyne and Wear